The 1968 Rebel 400 was a NASCAR Grand National Series event that was held on May 11, 1968, at Darlington Raceway in Darlington, South Carolina.

Summary
The time of the race was three hours and fifty-four seconds with a crowd of 22,500 attending. There were four cautions for twenty-three laps. David Pearson defeated Darel Dieringer in his 1968 Ford by eighteen seconds. Pearson took advantage of the NASCAR engine and weight rules for 1968 and used a 396 cid engine instead of the normal 427. At that time the car had to be 4,000 pounds with the 427 cid engine but only 3,707 pounds with the 396 cid engine. The lighter weight paid off as Pearson used less fuel and had fewer tire troubles than many of the other teams. Pearson would continue to use the 396 throughout the year.

Canadian racer Frog Fagan finished in 22nd place. Other notable drivers included Wendell Scott, Richard Petty, Buddy Baker, Elmo Langley, and Roy Tyner. Out of the thirty-four drivers, fifteen of them did not finish the race.

Total winnings for the 1968 Rebel 400 were $53,455 ($ when adjusted for inflation); first-place finisher Pearson earned $13,700 ($ when adjusted for inflation) while last-place finisher Hess walked away with $460 ($ when adjusted for inflation).

Lennie Waldo made his NASCAR Grand National Series debut in this event.

Qualifying

Finishers

 David Pearson
 Darel Dieringer
 Richard Petty
 Buddy Baker† (highest finishing Dodge entry)
 LeeRoy Yarbrough†
 James Hylton
 Bobby Isaac
 John Sears
 Bud Moore
 Elmo Langley
 Bill Champion
 E.J. Trivette (highest finishing Chevrolet entry)
 Wendell Scott†
 Don Tarr*
 Curtis Turner*
 Earl Brooks
 Henley Gray
 Lennie Waldo
 Clyde Lynn†
 Cale Yarborough*
 Paul Dean Holt 
 Frog Fagan
 Bobby Allison*
 Paul Goldsmith*
 Stan Meserve*
 Jabe Thomas*
 Wayne Smith*
 Charlie Glotzbach*
 Donnie Allison*
 Roy Tyner*
 Ed Negre*
 Tiny Lund*
 Neil Castles*
 Larry Hess* (only Rambler entry in the race)

* Driver failed to finish race

Timeline
Section reference:
 Start: David Pearson had the first-class position as the green flag was waved.
 Lap 19: LeeRoy Yarbrough took over the lead from David Pearson.
 Lap 28: Buddy Baker took over the lead from LeeRoy Yarbrough.
 Lap 59: Cale Yarborough took over the lead from Buddy Baker.
 Lap 63: Paul Goldsmith took over the lead from Cale Yarborough.
 Lap 65: Buddy Baker took over the lead from Paul Goldsmith.
 Lap 91: Donnie Allison had an accident on turn four.
 Lap 108: Charlie Glotzbach took over the lead from Buddy Baker.
 Lap 116: Buddy Baker took over the lead from Charlie Glotzbach.
 Lap 158: David Pearson took over the lead from Buddy Baker.
 Lap 203: Bobby Allison spun his vehicle on turn two.
 Lap 205: Richard Petty took over the lead from David Pearson.
 Lap 219: David Pearson took over the lead from Richard Petty.
 Lap 231: Cale Yarborough blew his vehicle's engine.
 Lap 233: Richard Petty took over the lead from David Pearson.
 Lap 240: David Pearson took over the lead from Richard Petty.
 Lap 243: Curtis Turner blew his vehicle's engine.
 Finish: David Pearson was officially declared the winner of the event.

References

Rebel 400
Rebel 400
Rebel 400
NASCAR races at Darlington Raceway